Michael Darwin Fuller (born April 7, 1953) is an American former professional football player who was a safety for eight seasons in the National Football League (NFL). He played college football for the Auburn Tigers. 

Fuller grew up in Mobile, Alabama, where he played football for John Shaw High School. While at Auburn University, he was named to the All-SEC first-team for the 1973 and 1974 seasons.

As a safety in the NFL, Fuller intercepted 17 passes, which he returned for 176 yards and a touchdown, and recovered 14 fumbles (9 on offense, 5 on defense).

He was also a kick returner on special teams. In his 8 NFL seasons, he gained 1,701 yards returning kickoffs and 2,660 yards returning punts, with 2 touchdowns and a 10.6 yards per return average.  Fuller recorded a 27-yard punt return in a 1981 AFC divisional playoff game against the Buffalo Bills and a 17-yard punt return in Super Bowl XVI.

References

External links
NFL.com player page

1953 births
Living people
Players of American football from Jackson, Mississippi
American football safeties
American football return specialists
Auburn Tigers football players
San Diego Chargers players
Cincinnati Bengals players